Tim Heed (born January 27, 1991) is a Swedish professional ice hockey defenceman who is currently playing with HC Ambrì-Piotta of the National League (NL). Heed was originally selected by the Anaheim Ducks 132nd overall in the 2010 NHL Entry Draft.

Playing career
Heed was a product of Södertälje SK and made his debut in the top-tier Swedish Hockey League (SHL) with the club during the 2009–10 season. In the following years he also spent time on loan with the Växjö Lakers and the Malmö Redhawks in the second highest ice hockey league in Sweden, HockeyAllsvenskan, and in the SHL.

In 2013, he joined SHL side Skellefteå AIK and won the Swedish championship in his first year with the team. In 2014–15 and 2015–16, he reached the SHL finals with Skellefteå, while receiving SHL Defenseman of the Year honors in 2014–15. Heed also competed in the Champions Hockey League with the team.

With his NHL rights not retained by the Anaheim Ducks, Heed was signed as a free agent by the San Jose Sharks on a one-year, two-way contract on May 24, 2016.

He signed a new two-year contract on June 19, 2017. He was later re-signed by the Sharks to a one-year contract on July 1, 2019.

On August 20, 2020, as an impending free agent from the Sharks, Heed was signed to a three-month contract through November 15, 2020 by HC Lugano of the National League (NL). Heed produced from the blueline with Lugano, posting 14 goals and 34 points through 47 regular season games.

As a free agent, Heed moved to the Russian KHL, agreeing to a two-year contract with HC Spartak Moscow, on 6 May 2021.

Following one season with Spartak, Heed opted to leave the KHL and return to the Swiss NL by signing a two-year contract with HC Ambrì-Piotta on 20 July 2022.

Personal life
Tim's father Jonas Heed, who also played defence, was selected by Chicago in the sixth round of the 1985 NHL Entry Draft.

Career statistics

Awards and honors

References

External links

1991 births
Living people
HC Ambrì-Piotta players
Anaheim Ducks draft picks
HC Lugano players
Malmö Redhawks players
San Jose Barracuda players
San Jose Sharks players
Skellefteå AIK players
Södertälje SK players
HC Spartak Moscow players
Ice hockey people from Gothenburg
Swedish expatriate ice hockey players in the United States
Swedish ice hockey defencemen
Växjö Lakers players
VIK Västerås HK players